Derrick Dewayne Dockery (born September 7, 1980) is a former professional American football guard in the National Football League (NFL) for the Washington Redskins, Buffalo Bills and Dallas Cowboys. He played college football at the University of Texas.

Early years
Dockery was born in Dallas County, Texas. He attended Lakeview Centennial High School in Garland, Texas, where he played football for the Lakeview Patriots.

As a senior in 1998, he was tabbed as a second-team All-USA offensive lineman by USA Today, and second-team Class 5A all-state selection by the Texas Sports Writers Association. He was a two-time first-team all-district performer at offensive tackle.

College career
Dockery accepted a football scholarship from the University of Texas at Austin. He played for coach Mack Brown's Texas Longhorns football team from 1999 to 2002.  As a true freshman in 1999, he served as a backup offensive guard, but saw action in all 14 games, including the Cotton Bowl Classic, at both guard spots and on special teams.

As a sophomore in 2000, he started in all 12 games at guard, including the Holiday Bowl. He helped pave the way for a Longhorns offense that averaged 38.6 points per game.

As a junior in 2001, he played in all 13 games, including the Holiday Bowl, and started nine contests at both guard spots, also seeing action at tackle. His line play contributed to the Longhorns leading the Big 12 Conference with 39.2 points per game (sixth in NCAA) and averaging 162.3 yards rushing, 250.3 passing, and 412.6 total yards per game.

As a senior in 2002, Dockery started all 13 games, seven at right guard and six at right tackle, while not allowing a sack. He was named a first-team All-Big 12 selection, and was recognized as a consensus first-team All-American, after receiving first-team honors from the Associated Press, Football Writers Association of America and Walter Camp Football Foundation. He shared the Longhorns' Outstanding Offensive Lineman Award and was a key member of a Longhorn offense that ranked fifth in the Big 12 and 16th nationally in scoring offense (33.8 points per game).

During his career, the team had a 40-12 record, including back-to-back 11-2 seasons and a top six ranking in 2001 and 2002. He played 52 consecutive games with 31 starts (25 at guard and 6 at tackle).

In 2018, he was inducted into the University of Texas Hall of Honor.

Professional career

Pre-Draft

First stint with Redskins
Dockery was selected in the third round (81st overall) of the 2003 NFL Draft by the Washington Redskins. In 2003, he began his rookie season as a backup at several positions along the offensive line, including left guard and right tackle. He was inserted into the starting lineup in Week 4 against the New England Patriots at left guard, which was his first career NFL start.

He would go on to start the final 13 games of the regular season at left guard. In 2004, he started all 16 games at left guard for the Redskins, teaming with left tackle Chris Samuels to form a solid tandem on the left side of the offensive line. He finished the season having garnered 29 consecutive starts at left guard, although he was one of the league leaders in false starts.

Buffalo Bills
On March 2, 2007, the Buffalo Bills signed Dockery to a 7-year $49 million contract with an $18 million signing bonus, the third largest in NFL history at his position. He was a two-year starter at left guard (32 games) and was part of one of the NFL's biggest offensive lines in terms of height and weight. In 2008, the unit struggled in pass protection (allowed 38 sacks) and the offense ranked 25th in the league in total yards. He was released in a salary-cap move on February 26, 2009.

Second stint with Redskins
On March 1, 2009, Dockery re-signed with the Washington Redskins to a 5-year, $26.5 million contract. He started 16 games at left guard, replacing free agent Pete Kendall. In 2010, he had a streak of 116 straight games played ended, when he was declared inactive in Week 5, after struggling playing in new head coach Mike Shanahan zone blocking scheme. He injured his left knee against the Tennessee Titans. He was released on March 1, 2011.

Dallas Cowboys
On September 4, 2011, Dockery was signed by the Dallas Cowboys. He started in the second game against the San Francisco 49ers in place of an injured Bill Nagy, but suffered a sprained medial collateral ligament and a tibial plateau fracture. He recovered in week 8 to replace an injured Montrae Holland as a backup guard for the rest of the season. On August 3, 2012, he was signed to be the backup guard to Mackenzy Bernadeau. He wasn't re-signed after the season.

Dockery finished his career after appearing in 141 games with 115 starts. He started his first career game in week four of the 2003 season, and went on to start 109 straight contests until 2010. He also had a stretch of 116 consecutive games.

Personal life
Following retirement from football, Dockery and his wife Emma attended George Washington University for their MBAs. Dockery has worked for several members of Congress such as Jason Chaffetz and Paul Ryan. In 2016, Speaker Paul Ryan hired Dockery to assist in building coalitions with state and local governments and the business community.

He is married to wife Emma and have three children. Famous ESPN sportscaster Chris Berman gave Dockery one of his famous nicknames: Derrick "Hickory Dickory" Dockery. His brother Cedric also played college football for the University of Texas.

References

External links
 Texas Longhorn Alumni: Derrick Dockery
 Hall of Honor bio

1980 births
Living people
African-American players of American football
All-American college football players
American football offensive guards
Buffalo Bills players
Dallas Cowboys players
Texas Longhorns football players
Washington Redskins players
People from Garland, Texas
Sportspeople from the Dallas–Fort Worth metroplex
21st-century African-American sportspeople
20th-century African-American people